This article lists international organizations of which Ukraine is a member or an observer.

Possible membership 
Ukraine is also a potential candidate for the following organizations:
 CEFTA (Central European Free Trade Agreement)
see: Ukraine, Croatia broaden ties
 European Union
see: European Union Association Agreement, Stabilisation and Association Process, European Neighbourhood Policy, Eastern Partnership, Ukraine–European Union relations, Future enlargement of the European Union
 NATO.
''see: Ukraine–NATO relations, Enlargement of NATO, Partnership for Peace, Lithuanian–Polish–Ukrainian Brigade

References 

Ukraine
Ukraine-related lists
Foreign relations of Ukraine